Edward Frederick Carpenter  (27 November 1910 – 26 August 1998) was an Anglican priest and author.

Life 
Carpenter was a native Londoner and the city featured prominently in his life and priestly ministry.  He was educated at Strode's Grammar School and King's College London and ordained in 1936. After curacies at Holy Trinity, Marylebone and St Mary's  Harrow he was Rector of Great Stanmore.

After this his ministry was spent at Westminster Abbey, from 1951 firstly as a canon, then from 1963 to 1974 as archdeacon and finally, from 1974, Dean of Westminster.<ref>The Times, Thursday, Apr 25, 1974; pg. 1; Issue 59073; col D New Dean</ref> One obituary noted "It was unfortunate for the Church that Edward Carpenter was 64 before he became Dean but he has left a legacy of tolerant, determined openness as a vital trait of 20th- century Christianity. He and his wife gave themselves unstintingly to others and contributed a happy sparkle in their home at Westminster in their laughter and scholarship."

Carpenter retired to Richmond, Surrey. He has four children, David, Michael, Paul and Louise.

Carpenter wrote Common sense about Christian ethics as part of the Common Sense series.

He was the first chairman of the Week of Prayer for World Peace, a global interfaith initiative created by the Anglican Pacifist Fellowship.

In 2017 Michael De-la-Noy published a biography of Carpenter, A Liberal and Godly Dean: The Life of Edward Carpenter'' (Gloriette Publications).

References

1910 births
1998 deaths
People educated at Strode's Grammar School
Alumni of King's College London
Associates of King's College London
Alumni of the Theological Department of King's College London
20th-century English Anglican priests
Anglican pacifists
20th-century British writers
Canons of Westminster
Archdeacons of Westminster
Deans of Westminster